is a former Japanese football player.

Playing career
Sato was born in Muroran on September 27, 1974. After graduating from Kokushikan University, he joined J1 League club Yokohama Flügels in 1997. He played many matches as center back and the club won the champions 1998 Emperor's Cup. However the club was disbanded end of 1998 season due to financial strain, he moved to Kyoto Purple Sanga in 1999. Although he played many matches, the club was relegated to J2 League from 2001. In 2001, the club won the champions and was returned to J1 in a year. However his opportunity to play decreased in 2002 and he moved to Consadole Sapporo in July. Although he played as starting member in all matches in 2002 season, the club was relegated to J2 from 2003. From 2004, he played many matches and retired end of 2005 season.

Club statistics

References

External links

1974 births
Living people
Kokushikan University alumni
Association football people from Hokkaido
Japanese footballers
J1 League players
J2 League players
Yokohama Flügels players
Kyoto Sanga FC players
Hokkaido Consadole Sapporo players
J2 League managers
Montedio Yamagata managers
Association football defenders
People from Muroran, Hokkaido